OPS may refer to:

Organizations
Obscene Publications Squad, a former unit of the Metropolitan Police in London, England
Oceanic Preservation Society
Office of Public Safety, a former US government agency
Orchestre philharmonique de Strasbourg
Ottawa Police Service
Oulun Palloseura, a Finnish sports club

Other uses
Old Pension Scheme, a pension scheme in India
O. Panneerselvam, Indian politician
Optical position sensor, a position sensitive device
Off-premises station, a telephone extension located off-site
On-base plus slugging, a baseball statistic
Open Pluggable Specification
Oriented polystyrene
Orthogonal polarization spectral imaging
Open Publication Structure, a specification for e-books in EPUB format
OPS-301, Operationen- und Prozedurenschlüssel, German healthcare procedure classification
Orange Pekoe Superior, a tea leaf grade

See also
 OP (disambiguation)
 OOPS (disambiguation)
 Ops (disambiguation)